Adrian Kashchenko (19 September 1858 – 16 March 1921) was a well-known Ukrainian writer, historian of Zaporozhian Cossacks.

Biography
Adrian Kashchenko was born in the family of small landowner claiming its roots to the Zaporozhian Cossacks in Yekaterinoslav Governorate (modern Dnipropetrovsk Oblast). Sharing the amongst nine siblings one of whom Mykola Kashchenko - would become a Ukrainian academician and the founder of Kiev Botanical Gardens. Adrian studied several years in gymnasium and military college, served as a small rank officer. Not finding himself in military career, A. Kashchenko became a clerk in the railway department, married and settled in Yekaterinoslav for some time. During his railway service Kashchenko was transferred to Perm, Saint-Petersburg, Tuapse and back to Yekaterinoslav. Although he was married, his wife later left, though she remained financially dependent on him.
 	
Kashchenko wrote both documentary and fiction stories about life of Zaporozhians and their environment. Among them short stories "Zaporozhska slava" ("Zaporizhian fame"), "Na ruinakh Sichi" ("On the ruins of Sich"), "Mandrivka na porohy" ("Trip to the sills"). At stories "Z Dnipra na Dunai" ("From Dnieper to Dunai"), "Zruinovane gnizdo" ("Ruined nest") where he attempted to show the negative aspects following the break-up of the Zaporozhian Host. Several documentary portraits of Cossack leaders were created: "Nad Kodatskim porohom" ("Under the Kodak sill") about Hetman Ivan Sulima, "Hetman Sahaidachny", "Kost Hordienko-Holovko - last knight of Zaporizhia".

Most of Adrian Kashchenko works were published in 1917 - 1919, during the epoch of Ukraine after the Russian Revolution and Ukrainian People's Republic (previous attempts did not gain wide publication due to the censorship in the Russian Empire). At that time Kashchenko took part in the Ukrainian Prosvita ("Enlightenment") society activities and even founded his own publishing house. Sudden illness and subsequent death in 1921 put an end to his scientific and public career.

Printing of Kashchenko stories was only renewed after Ukraine became independent.

Works of Adrian Kashchenko
 "The ruined nest"
 "The Story about Zaporizhian Army"
 "From Dnieper to Dunai"
 "Under the Kodak sill"
 "Hetman Sahaidachny"
 "Kost Hordienko-Holovko - last knight of Zaporizhia"
 "The Grand Meadow of Zaporizhia"

References

 Adrian Kashchenko. (1991). Zruinovane hnizdo: istorychni povisti ta opovidannia, Kyiv: Dnipro. .
 Adrian Kashchenko. (1991). Opovidannia Pro Slavne Viisko Zaporozke Nyzove, Dnipropetrovsk: Sich. .
 Adrian Kashchenko. (2001). Nad kodatskym porohom: istorychni povisti ta opovidannia, Kyiv: Dnipro. .
 Adrian Kashchenko. (1991). Bortsi za pravdu: istorychne opovidanie, Sich. .

External links 
 Information and bibliography of Adrian Kashchenko, Institute of Ukrainian History, Ukrainian Academy of Sciences 

1858 births
1921 deaths
People from Zaporizhzhia Oblast
20th-century Ukrainian historians
Ukrainian male short story writers
Ukrainian short story writers
Ukrainian publishers (people)